North Chuctanunda Creek flows into the Mohawk River in Amsterdam, New York. Variant names include Chucttonaneda Creek, Jutalaga, North Chaughtanoonda Creek, North Chuctenunda Creek, and Ouctanunda Creek.

References 

Rivers of Montgomery County, New York
Mohawk River
Rivers of New York (state)